Footlights is a 1921 American silent film romantic drama directed by John S. Robertson. It stars Elsie Ferguson and Reginald Denny as the lead characters. The film marked the only time star Ferguson and director Robertson worked together on a picture.

Cast
Elsie Ferguson as Lisa Parsinova / Lizzie Parsons
Reginald Denny as Brett Page
Marc McDermott as Oswald Kane
Octavia Handworth as Etta

Survival status

This romantic adventure cannot be assessed today as Footlights is presumably a lost film with no prints known to exist.  It was later remade in 1927 as The Spotlight, a vehicle for Esther Ralston. That film is lost as well.

References

External links

American silent feature films
1921 romantic drama films
Films directed by John S. Robertson
American black-and-white films
Lost American films
1921 films
American romantic drama films
Lost romantic drama films
1920s American films
Silent romantic drama films
Silent American drama films